Aconodes truncatus is a species of beetle in the family Cerambycidae. It was described by Stephan von Breuning in 1939. It is known from India.

It's 5–6 mm long and 1¾–2½ mm wide, and its type locality is Darjeeling.

References

Aconodes
Beetles described in 1939
Taxa named by Stephan von Breuning (entomologist)